The Man I Marry is a 1936 American drama film directed by Ralph Murphy and written by Harry Clork and M. Coates Webster. The film stars Doris Nolan, Michael Whalen, Charles "Chic" Sale, Nigel Bruce, Richard "Skeets" Gallagher, Marjorie Gateson, Cliff Edwards and Gerald Oliver Smith. The film was released on November 1, 1936, by Universal Pictures.

Plot

Cast       
Doris Nolan as Rena Allen
Michael Whalen as Ken Durkin
Charles "Chic" Sale as Sheriff Clem Loudecker
Nigel Bruce as Robert Hartley
Richard "Skeets" Gallagher as Jack Gordon
Marjorie Gateson as Eloise Hartley
Cliff Edwards as Jerry Ridgeway
Gerald Oliver Smith as Throckton Van Cortland
Ferdinand Gottschalk as Organist
Harry Barris as Piano Player
Edward McWade as Druggist
Harry Hayden as Minister
Rollo Lloyd as Woody Ryan
Peggy Shannon as Margot Potts
Richard Carle as Storekeeper
Lew Kelly as Counterman

References

External links
 

1936 films
American drama films
1936 drama films
Universal Pictures films
Films directed by Ralph Murphy
American black-and-white films
1930s English-language films
1930s American films